Tony Lanfranchi (25 June 1935 – 7 October 2004) was a British racing driver. He competed in many various events throughout a long racing career, including the 1965 24 Hours of Le Mans for Elva, non-championship Formula One races in 1968, and the British Formula Three Championship. Later in his career, he competed in saloon car racing, including the British Touring Car Championship.
"In his early racing days in Huddersfield he raced sports cars, including a Healey Silverstone, Austin-Healey and then an Elva Courier, in which he was quite successful in 1961. Nationally he made his mark in 1963 with an Elva-Ford Mk. VI."

On 16 September 1962, Lanfranchi won the inaugural Harewood hillclimb, setting the Fastest Time of the Day at 51.61s driving an Elva Mk VI.

In 1967, Lanfranchi was due to make his Formula One debut in the BRDC Daily Express Trophy meeting at Silverstone, but the transporter of the J.A. Pearce Racing Organisation burned out in the paddock prior to first practice. Three cars were destroyed and Lanfranchi was sidelined.

In 1980, a biography titled Down the Hatch : the life and fast times of Tony Lanfranchi by Mark Kahn was published.

In 2004, Lanfranchi died after suffering from cancer in his later years.

Racing record

Complete British Saloon / Touring Car Championship results
(key) (Races in bold indicate pole position; races in italics indicate fastest lap.)

† Events with 2 races staged for the different classes.

Complete 24 Hours of Le Mans results

Complete Formula One World Championship results
(key)

Non-Championship Formula One results
(key)

Complete European F5000 Championship results
(key)

References

External links
career at driver database

English racing drivers
British Formula Three Championship drivers
British Touring Car Championship drivers
English Formula One drivers
English people of Italian descent
24 Hours of Le Mans drivers
1935 births
2004 deaths
World Sportscar Championship drivers